Louisiana's 4th congressional district is a congressional district in the U.S. state of Louisiana. The district is located in the northwestern part of the state and is based in Shreveport-Bossier City. It also includes the cities of Minden, DeRidder, and Natchitoches.

The district is represented by Republican Mike Johnson.

History
The 4th congressional district was created in 1843, the first new district in the state in 20 years. It was gained after the 1840 U.S. Census.

For most of the next 150 years, the 4th was centered on Shreveport and northwestern Louisiana. However, in 1993, Louisiana lost a congressional district, based on population figures. Republican Jim McCrery ran for election in the new 5th and won, defeating Democrat Jerry Huckaby, who represented the old 5th for eight terms.

Meanwhile, the 4th was reconfigured as a 63-percent African American-majority district, stretching in a roughly "Z" shape from Shreveport to Baton Rouge. Democrat Cleo Fields was elected for two terms as the representative of the 4th congressional district. When the Supreme Court of the United States invalidated the boundaries of the new 4th congressional district as unconstitutional, the Louisiana legislature redrew the district to encompass most of Northwest Louisiana, closely resembling its pre-1993 configuration. It is white majority. McCrery was elected in 1996 to this seat.

Recent presidential elections

List of members representing the district

Recent election results

2002

2004

2006

2008

2010

2012

2014

2016

2018

2020

Historical district boundaries

See also

Louisiana's congressional districts
List of United States congressional districts

References

 Congressional Biographical Directory of the United States 1774–present

04
Shreveport, Louisiana